Balagoda (Bolani) is a census town in Kendujhar district in the state of Odisha, India.

Geography

Demographics
 India census, Balagoda (Bolani) had a population of 11,830. Males constitute 53% of the population and females 47%. Balagoda (Bolani) has an average literacy rate of 63%, higher than the national average of 59.5%; 72% of the males and 52% of females are literate. 14% of the population is under 6 years of age.

References

Cities and towns in Kendujhar district